Donald Lavert Rogers (September 17, 1962 – June 27, 1986) was an American professional football player who was a safety in the National Football League (NFL) for two seasons during the mid-1980s.  He played college football for the UCLA Bruins, and was recognized as an All-American.  Rogers played professionally for the NFL's Cleveland Browns, but his career was cut short when he died of a heart attack caused by cocaine use in 1986.

Early years
Rogers was born in Texarkana, Arkansas. He graduated from Norte Del Rio High School in Sacramento, California in 1980, where he excelled in football, basketball and baseball, garnering All-City honors in all three sports. His brother Reggie Rogers also played in the NFL.

College career
Rogers attended the University of California, Los Angeles, where he played for the Bruins.  He was Co-Player of the Game in the 1983 Rose Bowl for the UCLA, along with quarterback Tom Ramsey.  He also tied a Rose Bowl record in the 1984 Rose Bowl when he made two interceptions from Illinois Fighting Illini quarterback Jack Trudeau.

Professional career
Rogers was selected in the first round with the 18th pick of the 1984 NFL Draft by the Cleveland Browns. He played two seasons with the Browns from 1984 to 1985.

Death
Rogers died of a heart attack caused by a cocaine overdose the day before his wedding. His death came only eight days after Len Bias, an NBA draft pick who also died of cocaine abuse, prompting a national discussion about the relationship between illegal drugs and athletes.

References

Bibliography

1962 births
1986 deaths
All-American college football players
American football safeties
Cleveland Browns players
Cocaine-related deaths in California
National Football League Defensive Rookie of the Year Award winners
People from Texarkana, Arkansas
UCLA Bruins football players
Players of American football from Arkansas
Players of American football from Sacramento, California